The Frank Tindall Trophy is presented to the U Sports Football Coach of the Year. The award is dedicated in honour of the former U Sports head coach of the Queen's Golden Gaels (29 years, 106-74-2, 8 league and 1 national title). The Selection Committee is composed of members of the Carleton University Old Crow Society.

List of Frank Tindall Trophy winners

See also
Hec Crighton Trophy
J. P. Metras Trophy
Presidents' Trophy
Peter Gorman Trophy
Russ Jackson Award

References

External links
 U Sports Football Home Page

U Sports football trophies and awards
1969 establishments in Canada